Eucalyptus obliqua, commonly known as messmate stringybark or messmate, but also known as brown top, brown top stringbark, stringybark or Tasmanian oak, is a species of tree that is endemic to south-eastern Australia. It has rough, stringy or fibrous bark on the trunk and larger branches, smooth greyish bark on the thinnest branches, lance-shaped to curved adult leaves, flower buds in groups of seven to fifteen or more, white flowers and cup-shaped or barrel-shaped fruit.

Description
Flowering occurs in most months and the flowers are white.

Taxonomy
Eucalyptus obliqua was collected in 1777 by David Nelson and William Anderson during Cook's third expedition, and was the first eucalyptus species to be formally described. The collections were made at Adventure Bay on Bruny Island in what is now Tasmania. The specimens were sent to the British Museum in London, where they were examined by Charles Louis L'Héritier de Brutelle. L'Héritier recognised the specimens as belonging to a new genus which he called Eucalyptus and gave the name Eucalyptus obliqua to the species. The type species is therefore E. obliqua. L'Héritier published the first formal description in 1789 in his book Sertum Anglicum. The specific epithet (obliqua) is from the Latin obliquus ("oblique"), in reference to the leaf bases of unequal length.

Distribution and habitat
Messmate stringybark is widespread in cooler areas of south eastern Australia. It occurs from Kangaroo Island, through southeast South Australia, throughout Victoria and Tasmania, mainly east of the tablelands in New South Wales, with a few populations extending into southern Queensland. Severe winter frosts are common, severe drought extremely uncommon.

It occurs on a wide range of soils in hilly or mountainous areas. In cool mountainous areas it forms open-forest with other Eucalyptus species such as E. fastigata (brown barrel), E. nitens (shining gum), E. cypellocarpa (mountain grey gum), E. viminalis (manna gum) and E. delegatensis (alpine ash).

Uses
One of the most important Australian hardwoods, E. obliqua is often sold with E. regnans (mountain ash) as Victorian ash or Tasmanian oak depending on its origin. The sapwood is pale brown, the heartwood light brown. It has an even texture, with straight grains sometimes interlocked, and well-defined rings. Gum veins are common.

The timber has moderate hardness and strength, but low durability. It splits easily, and is easily worked, glued and stained; it is also suitable for steam bending. It is mostly used for pulp production and for construction and manufacture, especially in house building, joinery, flooring, and furniture.

Gallery

See also
 List of Eucalyptus species
 List of superlative trees

References

Trees of Australia
Trees of Mediterranean climate
obliqua
Myrtales of Australia
Flora of New South Wales
Flora of Queensland
Flora of South Australia
Flora of Tasmania
Flora of Victoria (Australia)
Taxa named by Charles Louis L'Héritier de Brutelle
Plants described in 1789